Kenfig Hill railway station served the village of Kenfig Hill, in the historical county of Glamorgan, Wales, from 1865 to 1958 on the Llynvi and Ogmore Railway.

History 
The station was opened as Cefn on 1 August 1865 by the Llynvi and Ogmore Railway. Its name was changed on 1 August 1885 to avoid confusion with a station of the same name in Wrexham. The station closed on 5 May 1958. No traces remain.

References

External links 

Disused railway stations in Bridgend County Borough
Railway stations in Great Britain opened in 1865
Railway stations in Great Britain closed in 1958
1865 establishments in Wales
1958 disestablishments in Wales